Diogo dos Santos Cabral (born 10 October 1998), known as Diogo Calila, is a Portuguese professional footballer who plays as a right-back for C.D. Santa Clara.

Club career

Belenenses
Calila was born in Seixal, Lisbon metropolitan area. A youth product of S.L. Benfica, he was promoted to the senior team of Belenenses SAD in January 2019. He made his Primeira Liga debut later that month, coming on as a 74th-minute substitute for Diogo Viana in a 3–0 away loss against FC Porto.

Calila played 20 matches – 23 in all competitions – in the 2020–21 season, helping his team finish tenth in the table. He subsequently renewed his contract until 2024.

On 27 November 2021, Calila was the only player available from the main squad to face Benfica, due to a bout of COVID-19. Nine players started the game, most of them from the under-23 side and two being goalkeepers; after seven returned for the second half with the score at 7–0 and one suffered an injury, the fixture was abandoned.

Santa Clara
In August 2022, Calila signed a three-year contract with C.D. Santa Clara with the option of a further two; his former club retained 20% of the player's rights.

Personal life
Calila's father, Carlos (who shared the same nickname), was also a footballer. A forward, he played mostly for C.F. Os Belenenses.

Career statistics

References

External links

1998 births
Living people
People from Seixal
Portuguese sportspeople of Cape Verdean descent
Sportspeople from Setúbal District
Portuguese footballers
Association football defenders
Primeira Liga players
Liga Portugal 2 players
Campeonato de Portugal (league) players
Belenenses SAD players
C.D. Santa Clara players